Pt Ram Prasad Bismil railway station is a small railway station in Shahjahanpur district, Uttar Pradesh. Its code is PRPM. It serves Shahjahanpur city. The station is named after a great freedom fighter Ram Prasad Bismil. The station consists of two platforms. The platform is not well sheltered. It lacks many facilities including water and sanitation.

Trains 

Some of the trains that runs from Pt Ram Prasad Bismil railway station are :

 Bareilly–Prayag Passenger 
 Prayag–Bareilly Passenger 
 Balamau–Shahjahanpur Passenger 
 Shahjehanpur–Balamu Passenger

References

Railway stations in Shahjahanpur district
Moradabad railway division